James McClellan may refer to:

 James H. McClellan, professor of signal processing
 James E. McClellan (1926–2016), American veterinarian and politician